Adjoba Astride N'Gouan (born 9 July 1991) is a French handballer for Paris 92 and the French national team. She is of Ivorian descent.

Achievements

Club 
Championnat de France:
Gold Medalist: 2019 and 2022 (with Metz Handball)
Silver Medalist: 2012 and 2014 (with Issy Paris Hand); 2017 and 2018 (with Brest Bretagne Handball)
Coupe de France:
Winner: 2018 (with Brest Bretagne Handball); 2019 and 2022 (with Metz Handball)
Finalist: 2014
Coupe de la Ligue :
Winner: 2013 (with Issy Paris Hand)
EHF Cup Winners' Cup:
Finalist: 2013 (with Issy Paris Hand); 
EHF Challenge Cup:
Finalist: 2014 (with Issy Paris Hand);

References

External links

1991 births
Living people
Black French sportspeople
French sportspeople of Ivorian descent
Sportspeople from Saint-Denis, Seine-Saint-Denis
French female handball players
European champions for France